Néstor Combin (born 29 December 1939) is a former professional footballer who played as a striker. Born in Argentina, he spent most of his professional career in France, most notably with Lyon, and represented the France national team at international level. He was dubbed "La Foudre" (The Lightning) in France, for his speed, and "Il Selvaggio" (the Savage) in Italy, for his fighting spirit.

Club career

Combin was born in Las Rosas, Argentina. During his time as a player in France, he scored 117 goals in the Division 1; 68 with Lyon and 49 with Red Star. In the 1973–74 season at Red Star, he formed a remarkable partnership in attack with Paraguayan forward Hugo González. In France, he also played for Metz, and in Italy for Juventus, Varese, Torino, and Milan. Combin scored 10 goals in 38 games for Juventus and 32 goals in 99 games for Torino.

Combin was one of the first French internationals who played abroad in Italy's Serie A. He won several titles there, including a Coppa Italia with both Juventus and Torino, and an Intercontinental Cup with Milan.

International career
Combin was born in Argentina, and was of French descent through his maternal grandmother. He has 8 caps with the France national team, obtained between 1964 and 1968, and scored four goals. He played at the 1966 FIFA World Cup with France.

Incident 
In a game between Milan and Argentine side Estudiantes for the 1969 Intercontinental Cup, Combin was dealt with aggressively by rival players and had his nose broken (the infamous "Bombonera Massacre"). When he was leaving the stadium, he was arrested, under a charge of desertion. After international pressure and indignation rising, he was released. In 2015, Raúl Madero blamed Combin as the fighting inciter, by provoking Ramón Aguirre Suárez in the first match, in Italy, saying "negro, don't warm up anymore because in one month I earn the same money that you receive in two years".

Honours
Lyon
Coupe de France: 1963–64

Juventus
Coppa Italia: 1964–65

Torino
Coppa Italia: 1967–68

Milan
Intercontinental Cup: 1969
Individual
Division 2 top scorer: 1973–74

References

 Archivio Toro - Official Torino F.C. Archives

External links
 
 

1939 births
Living people
Argentine people of French descent
French people of Argentine descent
Sportspeople of Argentine descent
French footballers
Argentine footballers
France international footballers
Association football forwards
Olympique Lyonnais players
Juventus F.C. players
S.S.D. Varese Calcio players
Torino F.C. players
A.C. Milan players
Serie A players
FC Metz players
Red Star F.C. players
Ligue 1 players
Ligue 2 players
1966 FIFA World Cup players
Argentine expatriate footballers
French expatriate footballers
Argentine expatriate sportspeople in Italy
French expatriate sportspeople in Italy
Expatriate footballers in Italy
Sportspeople from Santa Fe Province